Charles Bronson (born Charles Dennis Buchinsky; November 3, 1921 – August 30, 2003) was an American actor. Known for his "granite features and brawny physique," he gained international fame for his starring roles in action, western, and war films; initially as a supporting player and later a leading man. A quintessential cinematic "tough guy", Bronson was cast in various roles where the plot line hinged on the authenticity of the character's toughness and brawn. At the height of his fame in the early 1970s, he was the world's No. 1 box office attraction, commanding $1 million per film.

Born to a Lithuanian-American coal mining family in rural Pennsylvania, Bronson served in the United States Army Air Forces as a bomber tail gunner during World War II. He worked several odd jobs before entering the film industry in the early 1950s, playing bit and supporting roles as henchmen, thugs, and other "heavies". After playing a villain in the Western film Drum Beat, he was cast in his first leading role by B-movie auteur Roger Corman, playing the title character in the gangster picture Machine-Gun Kelly (1958). The role brought him to the attention of mainstream critics, and led to sizable co-lead parts as an Irish-Mexican gunslinger in The Magnificent Seven (1960), a claustrophobic tunneling expert in The Great Escape (1963), a small-town Southern louche in This Property Is Condemned (1966), and a prisoner-turned-commando in The Dirty Dozen (1967).

Despite his popularity with audiences and critics, Bronson was unable to find top-billed roles in major Hollywood productions. His acclaim among European filmmakers, particularly in France and Italy, led to a string of successful starring roles on the continent. He played a vengeful, Harmonica-playing gunman in Sergio Leone's epic Spaghetti Western Once Upon a Time in the West (1968), an offbeat detective in Rider on the Rain (1970), real-life Mafia turncoat Joe Valachi in The Valachi Papers (1972), and starred opposite Alain Delon in Adieu l'ami (1968) and Red Sun (1971). The success of those films proved his capability as a leading man and launched him to international stardom. In his home country, he played the architect-turned-vigilante Paul Kersey in Death Wish (1974) and its four sequels, a role that typified the rest of his career. He continued acting well into the 1980s, often in Cannon Films productions. His final role was in a trilogy of made for television films, Family of Cops, aired between 1995 and 1999.

For his contributions to the film industry, Bronson received a star on the Hollywood Walk of Fame in 1980.

Early life and war service
Bronson was born Charles Dennis Buchinsky, the eleventh of fifteen children, into a Roman Catholic family of Lithuanian origin in Ehrenfeld, Pennsylvania, in the coal region of the Allegheny Mountains north of Johnstown, Pennsylvania. His father, Walter Buchinsky (born: Valteris P. Bučinskis), was a Lipka Tatar from Druskininkai in southern Lithuania. Bronson's mother, Mary (née Valinsky), whose parents were from Lithuania, was born in the coal mining town of Tamaqua, Pennsylvania.

Bronson did not speak any English at home during his childhood in Pennsylvania, like many children he grew up with. He recalled that even back when he was in the army, his accent was strong enough to make his comrades think he came from another country (despite Bronson having been born and raised in the US). Besides English, he could also speak Lithuanian, Russian and Greek.

In a 1973 interview, Bronson said that he did not know his father very well and "I'm not even sure if I loved him or hated him." He said that all he could remember was that when his mother said that his father was coming home, the children would hide. When Bronson was 10 years old, his father died and he went to work in the coal mines, first in the mining office and then in the mine. He later said he earned one dollar for each ton of coal that he mined. In another interview, he said that he had to work double shifts to earn $1 a week. Bronson later recounted that he and his brother engaged in dangerous work removing "stumps" between the mines, and that cave-ins were common.

The family suffered extreme poverty during the Great Depression, and Bronson recalled going hungry many times. His mother could not afford milk for his younger sister, so she was fed warm tea instead. His family was so poor that he once had to wear his sister's dress to school for lack of clothing. Bronson was the first member of his family to graduate from high school.

Bronson worked in the mine until he enlisted in the United States Army Air Forces in 1943 during World War II. He served in the 760th Flexible Gunnery Training Squadron, and in 1945 as a Boeing B-29 Superfortress aerial gunner with the Guam-based 61st Bombardment Squadron within the 39th Bombardment Group, which conducted combat missions against the Japanese home islands. He flew 25 missions and received a Purple Heart for wounds received in battle.

Acting career

Acting training (1946–1951)
After the end of World War II, Bronson worked at many odd jobs until joining a theatrical group in Philadelphia, Pennsylvania. He later shared an apartment in New York City with Jack Klugman while both were aspiring to play on the stage. In 1950, he married and moved to Hollywood, where he enrolled in acting classes and began to find small roles.

Early film roles (1951–1954)
Until 1954, Bronson's credits were all as Charles Buchinsky. His first film role – an uncredited one – was as a sailor in You're in the Navy Now in 1951, directed by Henry Hathaway. Other early screen appearances were in The Mob (1951); The People Against O'Hara (1951), directed by John Sturges; Bloodhounds of Broadway (1952); Battle Zone (1952); Pat and Mike (1952), as a boxer and mob enforcer; Diplomatic Courier (1952), another for Hathaway; My Six Convicts (1952); The Marrying Kind (1952); and Red Skies of Montana (1952).

In 1952, Bronson boxed in a ring with Roy Rogers in Rogers' show Knockout. He appeared on an episode of The Red Skelton Show as a boxer in a skit with Skelton playing "Cauliflower McPugg". He appeared with fellow guest star Lee Marvin in an episode of Biff Baker, U.S.A., an espionage series on CBS starring Alan Hale Jr. In the following year, he had small roles in Miss Sadie Thompson (1953); House of Wax (1953), directed by Andre DeToth; The Clown (1953); Torpedo Alley (1953); and Riding Shotgun, starring Randolph Scott and again directed by DeToth.

In 1954, during the House Un-American Activities Committee (HUAC) proceedings, he changed his surname from Buchinsky to Bronson at the suggestion of his agent, who feared that an Eastern European surname might damage his career. Still as Buchinsky, he had a notable support part as an Apache, "Hondo", in the film Apache (1954) for director Robert Aldrich, followed by roles in Tennessee Champ (1954) for MGM, and Crime Wave (1954) directed by de Toth.

As Charles Bronson (1954–1958)
His first film as Charles Bronson was Vera Cruz (1954), again working for Aldrich. Bronson then made a strong impact as the main villain in the Alan Ladd western Drum Beat, directed by Delmer Daves, as a murderous Modoc warrior, Captain Jack (based on a real person), who relishes wearing the tunics of soldiers he has killed. He was in Target Zero (1955), Big House, U.S.A. (1955), and had a significant role in the Daves western Jubal (1956), starring Glenn Ford. 

He had the lead role in the episode "The Apache Kid" of the syndicated crime drama The Sheriff of Cochise, starring John Bromfield; Bronson was subsequently cast twice in 1959 after the series was renamed U.S. Marshal. He guest-starred in the short-lived CBS situation comedy, Hey, Jeannie! and in three episodes of Alfred Hitchcock Presents: "And So Died Riabouchinska" (1956), "There Was an Old Woman" (1956), and "The Woman Who Wanted to Live" (1962).

In 1957, Bronson was cast in the Western series Colt .45 as an outlaw named Danny Arnold in the episode "Young Gun". He had a support role in Sam Fuller's Run of the Arrow (1957). In 1958, Bronson appeared as Butch Cassidy on the TV western Tales of Wells Fargo in the episode titled "Butch Cassidy".

Leading man (1958–1960)

Bronson scored the lead in ABC's detective series Man with a Camera (1958–1960), in which he portrayed Mike Kovac, a former combat photographer freelancing in New York City.

He was cast in leading man roles in some low budget films, notably, Machine-Gun Kelly (1958), a biopic of a real life gangster directed by Roger Corman. He also starred in Gang War (1958), When Hell Broke Loose (1958), and Showdown at Boot Hill (1959).

On television, he played Steve Ogrodowski, a naval intelligence officer, in two episodes of the CBS military sitcom/drama, Hennesey, starring Jackie Cooper, and he played Rogue Donovan, an escaped murderer in Yancy Derringer (episode: "Hell and High Water"). Bronson starred alongside Elizabeth Montgomery in a Twilight Zone episode ("Two"; 1961). He appeared in five episodes of Richard Boone's Have Gun – Will Travel (1957–63).

Bronson had a support role in an expensive war film, Never So Few (1959), directed by John Sturges. Bronson was cast in the 1960 episode "Zigzag" of Riverboat, starring Darren McGavin. That same year, he was cast as "Dutch Malkin" in the episode "The Generous Politician" of The Islanders. Bronson appeared as Frank Buckley in the TV western Laramie in the 1960 episode "Street of Hate".

Leading support actor in Hollywood (1960–1968)

In 1960, he garnered attention in John Sturges' The Magnificent Seven, in which he was cast as one of seven gunfighters taking up the cause of the defenseless. During filming, Bronson was a loner who kept to himself, according to Eli Wallach. He received $50,000 for this role. This role made him a favorite actor of many in the former Soviet Union, such as Vladimir Vysotsky.

The following year, Bronson could be seen, again in the role of a boxer, in an episode of One Step Beyond (S3E16, titled "The Last Round"), aired January 10, 1961. AIP put Bronson in the romantic lead of Master of the World (1961), supporting Vincent Price. He had a support role in MGM's A Thunder of Drums (1961) but a bigger part in X-15 (1961).

In 1961, Bronson was nominated for an Emmy Award for his supporting role in an episode entitled "Memory in White" of CBS's General Electric Theater, hosted by Ronald Reagan. In 1962, he appeared alongside Elvis Presley in Kid Galahad. In 1963, he co-starred in the series Empire.

Sturges cast Bronson for another Hollywood production, The Great Escape (1963), as claustrophobic Polish prisoner of war Flight Lieutenant Danny Velinski, nicknamed "The Tunnel King" (coincidentally, Bronson really was claustrophobic because of his childhood work in a mine). The film was a huge hit and Bronson had one of the leads, but he still found himself playing a villain in 4 for Texas (1963) for Robert Aldrich.

During the 1963–64 television season Bronson portrayed Linc, the stubborn wagon master in the ABC western series The Travels of Jaimie McPheeters. In 1964, Bronson guest-starred in an episode of the western TV series Bonanza as Harry Starr ("The Underdog").

Bronson had the lead in Guns of Diablo (1965), a Western. In the 1965–1966 season, he guest-starred in an episode of The Legend of Jesse James. In 1965, Bronson was cast as Velasquez, a demolitions expert, in the third-season episode "Heritage" on ABC's WW II drama Combat!.

He had a relatively minor role in Battle of the Bulge (1965) and was billed fourth in MGM's The Sandpiper (1966), which the popularity of stars Richard Burton and Elizabeth Taylor propelled to a big success. He was billed third in This Property Is Condemned (1966).

In 1967, he guest-starred as Ralph Schuyler, an undercover government agent in the episode "The One That Got Away" on ABC's The Fugitive.

That year Aldrich gave Bronson an excellent role in The Dirty Dozen (1967), where he played an Army death row convict conscripted into a suicide mission. It was a massive box office success but Bronson was only the third lead. He seemed unable to make the transition to star of major studio films in Hollywood. In Villa Rides (1968) he supported Robert Mitchum and Yul Brynner, playing the real-life Rodolfo Fierro.

Stardom in Europe (1968–1972)

Bronson made a serious name for himself in European films. He was making Villa Rides when approached by the producers of a French film Adieu l'ami looking for an American co-star for Alain Delon. Bronson's agent Paul Kohner later recalled the producer pitched the actor "on the fact that in the American film industry all the money, all the publicity, goes to the pretty boy hero types. In Europe... the public is attracted by character, not face."

The film was a big success in Europe. Even more popular was Once Upon a Time in the West (1968) where Bronson played Harmonica. The director, Sergio Leone, once called him "the greatest actor I ever worked with", and had wanted to cast Bronson for the lead in 1964's A Fistful of Dollars. Bronson turned him down and the role launched Clint Eastwood to film stardom. The film was the biggest hit of 1969 in France.

Bronson appeared in a French action film, Guns for San Sebastian (1968) alongside Anthony Quinn. In Britain, he was cast in the lead of Lola (1969), playing a middle-aged man in love with a 16-year-old girl. He then made a buddy comedy with Tony Curtis in Turkey, You Can't Win 'Em All (1970).

Bronson then played the lead in a French thriller, Rider on the Rain (1970) which was a big hit in France. It won a Hollywood Golden Globe Award for Best Foreign Language Film.

Bronson starred in some French-Italian action films, Violent City (1970) and Cold Sweat (1970), the latter directed by Terence Young. He was in a French thriller, Someone Behind the Door (1971) alongside Anthony Perkins, then starred in another directed by Young, the French-Spanish-Italian Western, Red Sun (1971). The Valachi Papers (1972) was a third with Young; Bronson played Joseph Valachi.

That year, this overseas fame earned him a special Golden Globe Henrietta Award for "World Film Favorite – Male" together with Sean Connery.

Return to the U.S. and stardom (1972–1974)
In 1972, Bronson began a string of successful action films for United Artists, beginning with Chato's Land (1972), although he had done several films for UA before this in the 1960s (The Magnificent Seven, etc.).

Chato's Land was the first film Bronson made with director Michael Winner. Winner was reunited with Bronson in The Mechanic (1972) and The Stone Killer (1973). Bronson worked with Sturges on Chino (1973), then did Mr. Majestyk (1974) with Richard Fleischer based on a book by Elmore Leonard.

One film UA brought into the domestic mainstream was Violent City, an Italian-made film originally released overseas in 1970, but not issued in the U.S. until 1974 under the title The Family.

By 1973, Bronson was considered to be the world's top box office attraction, and commanded $1 million per film (approx $6.5 in 2022).

Death Wish series and departure from United Artists (1974–1980)

Bronson's most famous role came at age 52, in Death Wish, his most popular film, with director Michael Winner. He played Paul Kersey, a successful New York architect who turns into a crime-fighting vigilante after his wife is murdered and his daughter sexually assaulted. This movie spawned four sequels over the next two decades, all starring Bronson.

Bronson starred in two films directed by Tom Gries: Breakout (1975), and Breakheart Pass (1975), a Western adapted from a novel by Alistair MacLean, which was a box office disappointment. He also starred in the directorial debut of Walter Hill, Hard Times (1975), playing a Depression-era street fighter making his living in illegal bare-knuckled matches in Louisiana. He earned good reviews. Bronson reached his pinnacle in box-office drawing power in 1975, when he was ranked 4th, behind only Robert Redford, Barbra Streisand, and Al Pacino.

Bronson did a Western comedy for UA, From Noon till Three (1976) but it was not well received. At Warner Bros he made St. Ives (1976), his first film with director J. Lee Thompson. He played Dan Shomron in Raid on Entebbe (1977), then was reunited with Thompson in The White Buffalo (1977), produced by Dino de Laurentiis for UA. UA also released Telefon (1977), directed by Don Siegel.

Bronson went on to make two films for ITC, Love and Bullets (1979) and Borderline (1980). He was reunited with Thompson on Caboblanco (1980), and played Albert Johnson in Death Hunt (1981), opposite Lee Marvin.

Cannon Films era (1982–1989)
In the years between 1976 and 1994, Bronson commanded high salaries to star in numerous films made by smaller production companies, most notably Cannon Films, for whom some of his last films were made.

Bronson was paid $1.5 million by Cannon to star in Death Wish II (1982), directed by Michael Winner. In the story, architect Paul Kersey (Bronson) moves to Los Angeles with his daughter. After she is murdered at the hands of several gang members, Kersey once again becomes a vigilante. The film was a big success at the box office.

Cannon Films promptly hired Bronson for 10 to Midnight (1983), in which he played a cop chasing a serial killer. The film marks the fourth collaboration between Bronson and director J. Lee Thompson. The supporting cast includes Lisa Eilbacher, Andrew Stevens, Gene Davis, Geoffrey Lewis, and Wilford Brimley.

ITC Entertainment hired Thompson and Bronson for The Evil That Men Do (1984), co-starring Theresa Saldana and Joseph Maher. The film was adapted by David Lee Henry and John Crowther from the novel of the same name by R. Lance Hill. Bronson plays a former assassin, who comes out of retirement to avenge the death of his journalist friend.

Cannon reunited Bronson and Winner for Death Wish 3 (1985). It is the last to be directed by Winner. Kersey returns to battle with New York street punk gangs while receiving tacit support from an NYPD lieutenant (Ed Lauter).

In Murphy's Law (1986), directed by Thompson, Bronson plays Jack Murphy, a hardened, antisocial LAPD detective who turns to alcohol to numb the pain of harsh reality. His ex-wife, played by Angel Tompkins, has become a stripper and his career is going nowhere. His world is turned upside down when an ex-convict, played by Carrie Snodgress, frames him for putting her in prison earlier in his career.

Bronson next appeared in the TV movie Act of Vengeance (1986), directed by John Mackenzie, playing real-life union leader Joseph Yablonski. It premiered on April 21, 1986.

More typical of this period were four Cannon action films: Assassination (1987) directed by Peter Hunt, and three with Thompson: Death Wish 4: The Crackdown (1988), Messenger of Death (1989) and Kinjite: Forbidden Subjects (1989).

Final years
Bronson's appeared in 1991's The Indian Runner, directed by Sean Penn, followed by the TV movies Yes, Virginia, there is a Santa Claus (1991) and The Sea Wolf (1993).

Bronson's last starring role in a theatrically released film was 1994's Death Wish V: The Face of Death. His final films were a trilogy of TV movies which were Family of Cops (1995), Breach of Faith: A Family of Cops 2 (1997) and Family of Cops 3 (1999).

Screen persona and technique

At the time of his death, film critic Stephen Hunter said that Bronson "oozed male life-force, stoic toughness, capability, strength" and "always projected the charisma of ambiguity: Was he an ugly handsome man or a handsome ugly man? You were never sure, so further study was obligatory." Hunter said, "he never became a great actor, but he knew exactly how to dominate a scene quietly." Bronson "was the man with the name ending in a vowel ... who never left the position, never complained, never quit, never skulked. He simmered, he sulked, he bristled with class resentments, but he hung in there, got the job done and expected no thanks. His nobility was all the more palpable for never having to be expressed in words."

Bronson told critic Roger Ebert in 1974 that "I'm only a product like a cake of soap, to be sold as well as possible." He said that in the action pictures he was producing at the time, there was not much time for acting. He said: "I supply a presence. There are never any long dialogue scenes to establish a character. He has to be completely established at the beginning of the movie, and ready to work."

Director Michael Winner said that Bronson did not have to "go into any big thing about what he does or how he does it" because he had a "quality that the motion-picture camera seems to respond to. He has a great strength on the screen, even when he's standing still or in a completely passive role. There is a depth, a mystery – there is always the sense that something will happen."

Missed roles
Sergio Leone offered Bronson the part of "Man with No Name" in A Fistful of Dollars. Bronson declined, arguing that the script was bad. Bronson was again approached for a starring role in the sequel For a Few Dollars More but he passed, citing that the sequel's script was like the first film. Bronson was offered both the roles of Tuco and Angel Eyes in The Good, the Bad and the Ugly. Bronson wanted to accept but he had to decline both, as he was in England filming The Dirty Dozen. Bronson would later star in Leone's Once Upon a Time in the West (1968).

Ingmar Bergman wanted to make a film with Bronson but the actor turned him down. "Everything is weakness and sickness with Bergman," he said.

He was considered for the role of Snake Plissken in Escape from New York (1981), but director John Carpenter thought he was too tough looking and too old for the part, and decided to cast Kurt Russell instead.

Bronson auditioned for the role of Superman for the 1978 film adaptation, but producer Ilya Salkind turned him down for being too earthy and decided to cast Christopher Reeve.

Personal life

Character and personality
Bronson was scarred by his early deprivation and his early struggle as an actor. A 1973 newspaper profile said that he was so shy and introverted he could not watch his own films. Bronson was described as "still suspicious, still holds grudges, still despises interviews, still hates to give anything of himself, still can't believe it has really happened to him." He was embittered that it took so long for him to be recognized in the U.S., and after achieving fame he refused to work for a noted director who had snubbed him years before.

Critic Roger Ebert wrote in 1974 that Bronson does not volunteer information, does not elaborate, and has no theories about his films. He wrote that Bronson threatened to "get" Time magazine critic Jay Cocks, who had written a negative review he viewed as a personal attack, and that unlike other actors who projected violence on film, Bronson seemed violent in person.

Marriages
His first marriage was to Harriet Tendler, whom he met when both were fledgling actors in Philadelphia. They had two children, Suzanne and Tony, before divorcing in 1965. She was 18 years old when she met the 26-year-old Charlie Buchinsky at a Philadelphia acting school in 1947. Two years later, with the grudging consent of her father, a successful, Jewish dairy farmer, Tendler wed Buchinsky, a Catholic and a former coal miner. Tendler supported them both while she and Charlie pursued their acting dreams. On their first date, he had four cents in his pocket — and went on, now as Charles Bronson, to become one of the highest paid actors in the country.

Bronson was married to English actress Jill Ireland from October 5, 1968, until her death in 1990. He had met her in 1962, when she was married to Scottish actor David McCallum. At the time, Bronson (who shared the screen with McCallum in The Great Escape) reportedly told him, "I'm going to marry your wife". The Bronsons lived in a grand Bel Air mansion in Los Angeles with seven children: two by his previous marriage, three by hers (one of whom was adopted), and two of their own, Zuleika and Katrina, the latter of whom was also adopted. After they married, she often played his leading lady, and they starred in fifteen films together.

To maintain a close family, they would load up everyone and take them to wherever filming was taking place, so that they could all be together. The family frequented Snowmass, Colorado in the 1980s and early 1990s for the winter holidays.

On May 18, 1990, aged 54, after a long battle with breast cancer, Jill Ireland died of the disease at their home in Malibu, California. In the 1991 television film Reason for Living: The Jill Ireland Story, Bronson was portrayed by actor Lance Henriksen. In December 1998, Bronson was married for a third time to Kim Weeks, an actress and former employee of Dove Audio who had helped record Ireland in the production of her audiobooks. The couple were married for five years until Bronson's death in 2003.

Death
Bronson's health deteriorated in his later years, and he retired from acting after undergoing hip-replacement surgery in August 1998. Bronson died at age 81 on August 30, 2003, at Cedars-Sinai Medical Center in Los Angeles.

Although pneumonia and Alzheimer's disease have been cited as his cause of death, neither appears on his death certificate, which cites "respiratory failure", "metastatic lung cancer", with, secondarily, "chronic obstructive pulmonary disease" and "congestive cardiomyopathy" as the causes of death. He was interred at Brownsville Cemetery in West Windsor, Vermont.

Filmography

References

External links

 
 
 
 New publication with private photos of the shooting & documents of 2nd unit cameraman Walter Riml 
 Photos of the filming The Great Escape

1921 births
2003 deaths
20th-century American male actors
American male film actors
American male television actors
American people of Lithuanian descent
American people of Tatar descent
Burials in Vermont
Deaths from lung cancer in California
Deaths from chronic obstructive pulmonary disease
Deaths from respiratory failure
Deaths from cardiomyopathy
Male Spaghetti Western actors
Male Western (genre) film actors
Male actors from Malibu, California
Male actors from Pennsylvania
Military personnel from Pennsylvania
People from Cambria County, Pennsylvania
United States Army Air Forces personnel of World War II
United States Army Air Forces soldiers
Western (genre) television actors